This is a chronological list of India Test wicket-keepers.

This list only includes players who have played as the designated keeper for a match. On occasions, another player may have stepped in to relieve the primary wicket-keeper due to injury or the keeper bowling.

List
Test Match Career

See also

List of India Twenty-20 wicket-keepers

References

External links
 India test wicketkeepers

Wicket-keepers, Test
Indian
Indian
Wicket-keepers